Melonite is a telluride of nickel; it is a metallic mineral. Its chemical formula is NiTe2.  It is opaque and white to reddish-white in color, oxidizing in air to a brown tarnish.  

It was first described from the Melones and Stanislaus mine in Calaveras County, California in 1866, by Frederick Augustus Genth.

Melonite occurs as trigonal crystals, which cleave in a (0001) direction. It has a specific gravity of 7.72 and a hardness of 1–1.5 (very soft).

See also
 List of minerals
 Tenifer and Melonite finish

References

 D. M. Chizhikov and V. P. Shchastlivyi, 1966, Tellurium and Tellurides, Nauka Publishing, Moscow

External links 
 
 

Nickel minerals
Telluride minerals
Trigonal minerals
Minerals in space group 164
Transition metal dichalcogenides
Minerals described in 1866